Flying serpent may refer to:

 Fiery flying serpent, an entity mentioned in the Bible
 Flying serpent (asterism), an asterism in a Chinese constellation
 The Flying Serpent, a 1946 film directed by Sam Newfield

See also
 Flying snake, a genus of snakes
 Winged serpent (disambiguation)